"Cómo Es Posible Que a Mi Lado" is a song by Mexican singer Luis Miguel. It was released as the second single from the album Nada Es Igual... in 1996. "Cómo Es Posible Que a Mi Lado" was recognized at the 1998 BMI Latin Awards as one of the best performing songs of the year. A live version of the song was included on the album Vivo (2000). The music video the song was directed by Pedro Torres. Dancers on video: Daisy Fuentes, Carolina Losada y Rocío Vilardell

Charts

References

1996 songs
1996 singles
Luis Miguel songs
Spanish-language songs
Warner Music Latina singles
Songs written by Kiko Cibrian
Songs written by Luis Miguel